The 2014 Tour of Adygeya is a stage race held in Russia, with a UCI rating of 2.2. It was the twelfth stage race of the 2014 Women's Elite cycling calendar.

Stages

Stage 1
22 May 2014 — Kamennomostskiy to Pobeda, individual time trial (ITT)

Stage 2
23 May 2014 — Maykop to Pobeda,

Stage 3
24 May 2014 — Maykop to Maykop,

Stage 4
25 May 2014 — Tulskiy to Partizanskaya Polyana,

Classification leadership table

References

2014 in women's road cycling
2014 in Russian sport
Women's road bicycle races